Huichicocha (possibly from Quechua wich'i a large, wide-mouthed pitcher, qucha lake, "pitcher lake",  Hispanicized spelling Huichicocha and Huisquicocha where the Quechua word 'wiski' (huisqui), a borrowing from English, means whisky) is a lake in Peru located in the Junín Region, Huancayo Province, Chongos Alto District. Huichicocha lies northwest of Acchicocha, southwest of Yurajcocha and east of Coyllococha.

It is operated by Electroperu.

See also
List of lakes in Peru

References

INEI, Compendio Estadistica 2007, page 26

Lakes of Peru
Lakes of Junín Region
Dams in Peru
Buildings and structures in Junín Region